The Tri-City Posse was an American minor league baseball team located in the Tri-Cities of Washington. The team was a founding member of the independent Western Baseball League, and was not affiliated with any Major League Baseball team. Its home stadium was Tri-City Stadium, now Gesa Stadium, in west Pasco.

The Posse was founded in 1995 and played their final season in 2000, having won the league title in 1999.

See also
 Tri-City Dust Devils

Western Baseball League teams
Sports in the Tri-Cities, Washington
Professional baseball teams in Washington (state)
Sports clubs disestablished in 2000
Defunct independent baseball league teams